Aqu Suntu (Quechua aqu sand, suntu heap, pile, "sand heap", Hispanicized spelling Ajo Sunto) is a  mountain in the Wansu mountain range in the Andes of Peru. It is located in the Arequipa Region, La Unión Province, in the central part of the Huaynacotas District. Aqu Suntu lies southwest of Qarwa Urqu.

References 

Mountains of Arequipa Region